Hagwon is the Korean-language word for a for-profit private institute, academy, or cram school prevalent in South Korea. Although most widely known for their role as "cram schools", where children can study to improve test scores, hagwons actually perform several educational functions:

 supplementary education that many children need just to keep up with the public school curriculum
 remedial education for the children who fall behind in their work
 training in areas not covered in schools (or covered poorly in public schools)
 preparation for students striving to improve test scores and preparing for the high school and university entrance examinations (the university entrance exam is also called suneung (수능))

Many other children, particularly younger children, attend nonacademic hagwons for piano lessons, art instruction, swimming, and taekwondo (태권도). Most young children in South Korea attend a hagwon. Hagwons also play a social role; occasionally children ask to be sent because their friends attend. There also exist hagwons for adults, such as flower arrangement and driving instruction hagwons. The term is also sometimes used to describe similar institutions operated by Korean Americans in the United States.

Children of all ages often attend hagwons, even pre-school aged children. It is not uncommon for students to be enrolled in several hagwons of different subject areas at once in addition to their normal school attendance. Hagwons often specialize in subjects like mathematics, foreign languages, science, arts, or music. Additionally there are flight attendant, pro gamer, hip hop, and aspiring K-pop hagwons. Many hagwons also have adults as students, particularly those dedicated to teaching the English language.

While some see hagwons as filling a need not being adequately met by the public school system, others see them as creating an unequal footing between the poor and rich in Korea.

In 2008, it was reported that there were over 70,000 hagwons in South Korea with 47 percent of them focused on high school enrollment.

History and regulations
In 1885, Henry Appenzeller founded the Paichai school (배재대학교) as a cover for his missionary work. At the time it was illegal to preach other religions in Korea. Although his main goal was to spread his faith, it was still used by Koreans to learn English.

Private education, known as gwaoe (과외), was banned by President Chun Doo-hwan (전두환) in 1980. It was felt the advantage of private education unfairly burdened the poor and to promote equality, all access to it was made illegal. Through the years the government has relaxed the restrictions on private education by increasingly allowing more individuals and organizations to offer private education until the ban was ruled unconstitutional in the 1990s.

Korean courts have ruled that it may violate the constitution for the government to limit the amount of money hagwons can charge. In early 2008, the Seoul government was working on changes to the regulations to allow hagwons to set their own hours, citing individual choice as trumping regulation. However, the government reversed its position five days later. The regulations were criticized as ineffective because the city council possessed limited resources to monitor and enforce them. Along with these restrictions, hagwons also had to disclose their tuition amounts to the government so people could complain if the schools attempted to raise the tuition. The licenses of hagwons caught running false advertisements will be revoked. Hagwons are required to issue cash receipts. In July 2009, to help catch violators of these new regulations, the government started a program to reward people who reported them. The regulations were intended to reduce the cost of private education. However, some hagwons added weekend classes to compensate for shorter weekday classes. Other parents have sought out private tutors to make up for lost study time. Other hagwons simply ignored the regulations. It was reported in April 2009 that 67 percent of hagwons sampled were found to have overcharged for tuition. Forty percent were found to have charged parents over two times the registered tuition amount.

In March 2008, the government prohibited school teachers from creating test questions for hagwons. It had been found that some teachers were leaking tests and test questions to hagwons, giving the students who attended those schools advantages when it came time to take the test.

A petition was made in October 2009 by parents, teachers, students and hagwon owners to challenge the government's legislation regarding hagwon closing times in Seoul and Busan. The constitutional court ruled that the laws did not violate the constitution. The restriction was put in place for Seoul and Busan in the summer of 2009. In making the ruling the court said, "Because it’s important to secure sleep for high school students to overcome fatigue and for the sake of their growth, it’s difficult to say that [the ban] excessively restricts basic rights."

In April 2010 it was reported that there were over 25,000 hagwons registered with the Seoul Metropolitan Office of Education, with nearly 6,000 being in the Gangnam area. It was also revealed that local government councils other than Seoul had decided not to implement the 22:00 curfew. The curfew was seen as not having an impact on education fees and not addressing the real concern with private education. Despite the curfew, there have been attempts to get around this curfew among hagwons in Seoul.

Impact on real estate 
A higher than average concentration of hagwons in the Gangnam-gu (강남구) area, specifically Daechi-dong (대치동), has been cited as the primary reason for an increase in real estate costs in the area. In the 1970s the Seoul government made some top schools relocate to the area; however, the schools there have become associated with entry into elite high schools and then elite universities. Many residents feel their children need to be associated with these schools in order to reach the upper levels of business and success. As more parents try to move to the area to allow their children to attend these schools, the prices of real estate in the area have risen to 300 percent of similar areas in Seoul. In 2003 the government had planned to develop a hagwon center in Pangyo to relieve some of the pressure on Gangnam, yet after heavy criticism for only shifting the problem around and not solving it, the government canceled the plan only a couple of weeks later.

English-language instructors

Native English speakers were hired as early as 1883 in Korea, originally out of need. The first teacher hired at the government-run Tongmunhak was Thomas Hallifax. Due to the preference for having native English speakers teach English, many native English-speakers are still hired to teach at hagwons in Korea. These hagwons may be only English schools or they could also be schools which have a variety of subjects including English. The minimum requirements for foreigners for such teaching positions are: citizenship of Australia, Canada, Ireland, New Zealand, South Africa, the United Kingdom, or the United States, a clean criminal background check at the national level, and a bachelor's degree obtained in one of the aforementioned countries. In return for signing a one-year contract, the institute provides an instructor with a monthly salary, round-trip airfare from his or her country of origin, usually a rent-free apartment or housing stipend for the duration of the instructor's contract, a pension pay for some citizens, and an additional one-month "severance pay" at the completion of the contract.

Foreign instructors hold a mixed view of hagwons. Some have complained of poor housing, non-payment, disagreements, and getting fired on the 11th month before they receive severance pay, however many instructors have had no significant issues with the hagwon they've worked at. Some recommend looking at hagwon blacklists or greenlists, but others say they aren't necessarily that reliable.

Hagwon owners have complained about the challenge in finding truly qualified teachers. A group of English instructors first formed a labour union at a hagwon in 2005.

Hagwons abroad
In some English-speaking countries, hagwons exist for ethnic Koreans. In North America, about 75% of Korean-language supplemental schools have affiliation with churches. As of 2006, of the hagwons registered with the Korean School Association of America (KSAA), over 75% were affiliated with Korean churches. There are also secular formal hagwons and secular informal hagwons. The hagwons are equivalent to hoshū jugyō kō (hoshūkō) in ethnic Japanese communities and buxiban in ethnic Chinese communities. As of 2010, every year over 50,000 Korean Americans attend Korean heritage schools.

Korean schools were first established in Hawaii after 1903, when the first wave of Korean immigration came to the United States. The modern generation of Korean supplemental schools were first established in the United States in the 1970s. At the time they were weekend schools that had a mission to preserve the Korean-American identity in its students. They taught the Korean language, managed the assimilation of Korean-American children, and offered afterschool tutoring programs. There were almost 500 schools registered with the KSAA by the end of the 1980s. Beginning in the 1990s there were also hagwons that were supplementary academic preparation programs like the ones in Korea.

Kang Hee-Ryong, author of the PhD thesis White supremacy, racialization, and cultural politics of Korean Heritage Language Schools, wrote that the Korean heritage schools are "not simply a means of counter hegemony against the racializing forces" but instead the "product of compromises" between different generations of Korean Americans.

See also
Education in South Korea
Ronin (student)
Storefront school

References
 Kang, Hee-Ryong (University of Wisconsin-Madison). White supremacy, racialization, and cultural politics of Korean Heritage Language Schools (PhD thesis). 2010. . 
 Zhou, Min, & Kim, Susan S. (University of California, Los Angeles). "Community forces, social capital, and educational achievement: The case of supplementary education in the Chinese and Korean immigrant communities" (Archive). Harvard Educational Review, 2006. 76 (1), 1-29.
 Kim, K. K. (2007). Jaemihanin Minjokkyooke Kwanhan Yongoo (A Study on the Development of the Ethnic Education for Koreans in the United States). The Korea Educational Review, 13 (1), 57–87.

Notes

External links
 한국학원총연합회 (Korea Association of Hakwon)

Academic pressure in East Asian culture
Education in South Korea
Test preparation companies